All That Falls Has Wings is a 1990 South Korean film directed by Jang Gil-su. Among many other honors, it was awarded Best Film at the Grand Bell Awards ceremony.

Plot
This youth melodrama tells the story of a law student from a small village in Korea, and the irresponsible girl with whom he falls in love. The girl leads a reckless life, working in bars in Itaewon, and in the U.S., while the law student follows her. Their relationship ends in tragedy with the man shooting the woman, and her confessing her true love before dying.

Cast
Kang Soo-yeon
Son Chang-min
Choi Min-sik
Lee Hyo-jung
An Hye-ri
Lee Nak-hoon
Moon Mi-bong
Lee Jong-man
Kim Jeong-rim
Kim Ju-eon
Kim Ji-young

References

External links

Best Picture Grand Bell Award winners
1990s Korean-language films
Films set in the United States
South Korean romance films
1990 romance films